Charles Brandon Potter (born July 28, 1982) is an American actor. He is known for his work voice acting, directing, and script writing on various anime dubs for Funimation.

Filmography

Anime series

Film

Live-action

Video games

Production credits

References

External links
Brandon Potter at MySpace

Living people
American male voice actors
American voice directors
American television writers
Place of birth missing (living people)
American male screenwriters
American male television writers
1982 births